BrahMos-II or BrahMos-2 or BrahMos Mach II (note:Not to be confused with the BrahMos block II)
is a hypersonic cruise missile currently under joint development by India's Defence Research and Development Organisation and Russia's NPO Mashinostroyenia, which have together formed BrahMos Aerospace Private Limited. It is the second of the BrahMos series of cruise missiles. During the cruise stage of flight the missile will be propelled by a scramjet airbreathing jet engine. Other details, including production cost and physical dimensions of the missile, are yet to be published.
The planned operational range of the BrahMos-II had initially been restricted to 290 kilometres as Russia is a signatory to the Missile Technology Control Regime (MTCR), which prohibits it from helping other countries develop missiles with ranges above . However, subsequent to India becoming a MTCR signatory in 2014, the parameters for Brahmos 2 will get  enhanced. Its top speed will be double that of the current BrahMos-I, and it has been described as the fastest cruise missile in the world.

Testing was planned to start in 2020, but has been delayed.

Fourth-generation multi-purpose Russian Naval destroyers (Project 21956) are also likely to be equipped with the BrahMos II.

BrahMos Aerospace named the missile BrahMos-II (K) in honour of the former President of India, APJ Abdul Kalam.

See also

 DRDO HSTDV
 Zircon  maneuvering hypersonic missile
 Shaurya (missile)
 Chinese YJ-12

References

External links 
 

Cruise missiles
Anti-ship cruise missiles of India
Anti-ship cruise missiles of Russia
Ramjet engines
India–Russia relations
NPO Mashinostroyeniya products